Jakov Cindro (1755–1818) was a Dalmatian noble that served as the first Mayor of Split between 1806 and 1809.

Sources
 

Mayors of Split, Croatia
1755 births
1818 deaths